MreB is a protein found in bacteria that has been identified as a homologue of actin, as indicated by similarities in tertiary structure and conservation of active site peptide sequence. The conservation of protein structure suggests the common ancestry of the cytoskeletal elements formed by actin, found in eukaryotes, and MreB, found in prokaryotes. Indeed, recent studies have found that MreB proteins polymerize to form filaments that are similar to actin microfilaments. It has been shown to form multilayer sheets comprising diagonally interwoven filaments in the presence of ATP or GTP.

MreB along with MreC and MreD are named after the mre operon (murein formation gene cluster E) to which they all belong.

Function 
MreB controls the width of rod-shaped bacteria, such as Escherichia coli. A mutant E. coli that creates defective MreB proteins will be spherical instead of rod-like. Also, most bacteria that are naturally spherical do not have the gene encoding MreB. Members of the Chlamydiota are a notable exception, as these bacteria utilize the protein for localized septal peptidoglycan synthesis. Prokaryotes carrying the mreB gene can also be helical in shape. MreB has long been thought to form a helical filament underneath the cytoplasmic membrane, however, this model has been brought into question by three recent publications showing that filaments cannot be seen by electron cryotomography and that GFP-MreB can be seen as patches moving around the cell circumference.  It has been shown to interact with several proteins that are proven to be involved in length growth (for instance PBP2). Therefore, it probably directs the synthesis and insertion of new peptidoglycan building units into the existing peptidoglycan layer to allow length growth of the bacteria.

References

Further reading 

  - source of information added to this entry as of February 20, 2006
 
 
 

Cytoskeleton proteins
Prokaryotic cells